Woodthorpe may refer to the following places in England:

Woodthorpe, Staveley, a village in the parish of Staveley, in the Borough of Chesterfield, Derbyshire
Woodthorpe, North East Derbyshire, a former civil parish of Chesterfield Rural District, near Clay Cross, Derbyshire
Woodthorpe, Leicestershire
Woodthorpe, Lincolnshire, a location
Woodthorpe, North Yorkshire
Woodthorpe, Nottinghamshire
Woodthorpe, South Yorkshire, in Richmond, Sheffield

See also
Woodthorpe (surname)